Death Ship may refer to:
"Death Ship" (The Twilight Zone), TV series episode
The Death Ship, a 1926 novel by B. Traven
The Death Ship (1928 film), a short film written by Joseph Jackson
The Death Ship (1959 film), an adaptation of the Traven novel
Death Ship (1980 film), a film starring George Kennedy

See also
Ghost Ship (disambiguation)